Sapo tahu is a Chinese Indonesian tofu dish traditionally cooked and served in claypot. Sapo tahu may be served as a vegetarian dish, or with chicken, seafood (especially shrimp), minced beef or pork. It is a popular tofu dish in Indonesia, with several Chinese restaurants competing to serve the best-tasting sapo tahu in Jakarta.

Ingredients
Its main ingredient is soft and smooth silken or egg tofu, cooked in claypot with vegetables including carrots, mushrooms, mustard greens, leeks, Chinese cabbage, common beans, cauliflower, broccoli, baby corn, garlic and onion, seasoned with soy sauce, oyster sauce, fish sauce, salt and pepper. Sapo tahu usually also contains chicken or seafood, including shrimp, squid and fish.

Cooking method and utensils
Traditionally, sapo tahu are strictly cooked in a traditional Chinese claypot on a charcoal fire. However, today it might be cooked in a common metal wok, cauldron or saucepan instead.

See also

 Claypot chicken rice
 Mun tahu
 List of tofu dishes
 Cap cai
 Tahu goreng
 Chinese Indonesian cuisine

References

Indonesian Chinese cuisine
Tofu dishes